HoboSapiens is a solo studio album by John Cale, his first album since 1996's Walking on Locusts. HoboSapiens was released by EMI in October 2003, and was preceded by the EP 5 Tracks in May 2003. A single was released for "Things" shortly after the album's release. Cale co-produced the album with Nick Franglen of Lemon Jelly, and Brian Eno provided the drum loop for the song "Bicycle". The album was met with widespread critical acclaim.

Release and reception

Between the release of Walking on Locusts in 1996 and the recording of HoboSapiens, John Cale worked on film scores, classical pieces, and composed the score Dance Music for the tribute ballet Nico. In a 2004 interview with Time Out New York, Cale attributed the quick, streamlined recording of HoboSapiens to his soundtrack endeavours and modern studio advances, stating that "The songs on Hobo are different from my past stuff in that nearly all of them were written in the studio. I don't like being in the studio, so I'd try to get things done as fast as possible and run to the gym. New recording methods are gratifying — you get to where you want to go very swiftly."

HoboSapiens was released by EMI in Europe on 6 October 2003, and nearly a year later in the United States by Or Music on 7 September 2004. The album was released to mostly positive reviews; at Metacritic, which assigns a normalized rating out of 100 based on reviews from mainstream critics, the album has received "universal acclaim" with a score of 89, based on 16 reviews. AllMusic's Thom Jurek stated that "Cale's reentry into the world of pop music is a contentious and accessible one. This is the Welsh iconoclast at his most elegant, energetic, and innovative," while Brian James of PopMatters claimed that "HoboSapiens is dense and difficult for much of its running time, but the challenge comes from following the author through his many compositional twists rather than sitting through passages that drone on far too long."

A CD single was released for "Things" with the additional album track "Things X" in mid-October 2003. A re-recorded version of "Set Me Free", originally found on the album Walking on Locusts, appears as a hidden track in the CD's pregap on European pressings of the album, while the song was issued as a bonus track on North American pressings.

Track listing

Release history

Personnel
John Cale - keyboards, guitars, electric viola, viola, vocals, backing vocals, samples, bass, harmonium
Andy Green - guitar, samples, additional production
Erik Sanko - bass, slack dulcimer
Joe Gore - guitar
Emil Miland - cello
Ryan Coseboom - samples
Mikael "Count" Eldridge - drum loops, samples
Marco Giovino - drums, percussion
Roberto, Daniele, Alba Clemente, Giovani - Italian voices
Lance Doss - guitars, backing vocals
John Kurzweig - guitars
Joel Mark - guitars, bass
Jeff Eyrich - bass
Bill Swartz - drums
Eden Cale - spoken words
Dimitri Tikovoï - samples
Brian Foreman - bass
Shelley Harland - samples
Lisa Bielawa, Elizabeth Farnum, Alexandra Montano, Gayla Morgan - a tonal voices
Brian Eno - drum loops on "Bicycle" 
Technical
Photography - Jon Shard
Art direction and design - Rick Myers
Executive producer - Nita Scott
Recorded at MediaLuna, New York City; Globe Studios, New York City; Engine Studios, Chicago; D's Attic, London; and SF Soundworks, San Francisco
Mixed at Eden Studios, London

References 

John Cale albums
2003 albums
Albums produced by John Cale
EMI Records albums
Albums produced by Nick Franglen